Lali en Vivo was a headlining concert tour by Argentine singer Lali Espósito. It was Espósito's third headlining tour, and the second one in support of her second studio album, Soy (2016). The tour began on November 3, 2017, in Buenos Aires, and concluded on July 28, 2018, in Barcelona.

Background
On July 24, 2017, Espósito first announced that she was going on tour later that year with a brand new show. The show was supposed to be the continuation of her Soy Tour, but the singer told Billboard that, because of all the changes she had made, she had to rename it to "Lali en Vivo". In an interview with Infobae, Espósito said "Lali en Vivo will be the biggest thing (at the technical level) that I have ever done so far. It will have an impressive staging (lights, screens, stage), a lot of dancers and special guests." Tickets for the show of November 3, 2017 at the Luna Park Arena sold out in less than four days, resulting in a second date on November 10 at the same place.

Concert synopsis
The show begins with a video of Lali getting ready for the show. Espósito appears from behind a screen that splits in two, performing "Mi Religión" in a black bodysuit and thigh-high pointed boots, followed by "Te Siento" and "Unico". Before performing "Boomerang", an interlude that features images from its music video is played. Wearing a golden crop top and an oversized jean jacket with golden chains, the singer then performs "Tu Revolución".  After making everyone dance, the lights go down and Lali appears wearing embroidered-golden Palazzo trousers, and a crop top and a coat of the same color to perform an intimate medley of ballads, including "Del Otro Lado", "Cielo Salvador", "Desamor" and "Cree en Mí".

For the next segment of the show, the heat returns while Lali performs "Soy" in a colorful-metallic bodysuit. Accompanied by all-female dancers dressed the same way, the singer sings "Una Na" and "Bomba". Then, she appears in a short red dress and performs "Lejos de Mí", "Ego", "Reina" and "Amor es Presente". Towards the end of the show, Lali returns to the stage in a white one-pice suit with chains to perform some of her danceable hits like "Mil Años Luz", Irresistible and "A Bailar".

The singer begins the last segment of the show singing two songs from her upcoming studio album. For "Tu Novia", she is accompanied by her dancers to perform a hot choreography, while for "Tu Sonrisa", she plays the harmonica and is accompanied by her band. Espósito closes off the show performing "No Estoy Sola" while confetti rains down and she disappears from the stage.

Setlist
This set list is representative of the show on November 3, 2017 in Buenos Aires, Argentina. It is not representative of all concerts for the duration of the tour.

 "Mi Religión"
 "Te Siento"
 "Unico"
 "Boomerang"
 "Tu Revolución"
 "Del Otro Lado" / "Cielo Salvador" / "Desamor"
 "Cree en Mí"
 "Soy"
 "Histeria"
 "Una Na"
 "Bomba"
 "Lejos de Mí"
 "Ego"
 "Reina"
 "Mueve"
 "Amor Es Presente"
 "Mil Años Luz"
 "Irresistible"
 "A Bailar"
 "Roma-Bangkok"
 "Asesina"
 "Tu Sonrisa"
 "Tu Novia"
 "No Estoy Sola"

Shows

Notes

References

Lali Espósito concert tours
2017 concert tours
2018 concert tours
Concert tours of South America
Concert tours of Europe
Concert tours of Asia
Concert tours of North America